Edson Eli Montaño Angulo (born 15 March 1991) is an Ecuadorian footballer who plays as a forward for the Ecuador national team and C.D. Técnico Universitario.

Club career
He had been playing throughout his youth at Barcelona and El Nacional. At the start of the 2010–11 season, he signed a three year-contract with the First Division-team KAA Gent.

Montaño’s youth team, El Nacional, sold the 19-year-old attacker to KAA Gent at an unknown transfer price. The transfer gave KAA Gent, according to a press article of the team, the possibility to add a young promising player to the team. 
Montaño plays as leader of the Ecuadorian selection and has been playing the international contest of players younger than 20 years in Spain (el Torneo Internacional sub 20 de l'Alcúdia).
On the ninth matchday, he was in the starting team in the game against STVV and by this, he made his début in the first team of KAA Gent.

In January 2012, Montaño returned to his native Ecuador to play for his old team Barcelona.

On 25 June 2014, Montaño signed for Australian A-League side Newcastle Jets for a year on loan. Montaño made his debut for the Jets on 11 October and was unable to help his side as they lost 1–0 to local rivals Central Coast Mariners. Montaño scored his first A-League goal in the Round 2 clash against Melbourne City, helping the Jet's to a 1–1 draw, courtesy of his emphatic finish. He retained his decent goal-scoring form scoring against the Mariners, Sydney, another against City, and an additional goal against the Roar in the culminating clash of the season. On 10 April, he scored against Melbourne Victory to give his side a 1–0 unforeseen win over the ladder leaders, Victory, a win that benumbed Victory supporters. This emphatic finish moved them off the bottom of the table.

References

External links
Montaño's FEF player card 

1991 births
Living people
Ecuadorian footballers
Ecuadorian expatriate footballers
Sportspeople from Guayaquil
Association football forwards
Ecuador international footballers
2011 Copa América players
C.D. El Nacional footballers
K.A.A. Gent players
Barcelona S.C. footballers
Newcastle Jets FC players
S.D. Aucas footballers
C.D. Clan Juvenil footballers
C.S.D. Independiente del Valle footballers
Club Atlético Sarmiento footballers
Orense S.C. players
C.D. Técnico Universitario footballers
Ecuadorian Serie A players
A-League Men players
Belgian Pro League players
Ecuadorian expatriate sportspeople in Belgium
Ecuadorian expatriate sportspeople in Argentina
Expatriate footballers in Belgium
Expatriate soccer players in Australia
Expatriate footballers in Argentina